Attack Squadron 15 (VA-15), nicknamed the Valions, was an aviation unit of the United States Navy. It was established as Torpedo Squadron 4 (VT-4) on 10 January 1942, redesignated VA-2A on 15 November 1946, and finally redesignated VA-15 on 2 August 1948. The squadron was disestablished on 1 June 1969, after 27 years of service.

Operational history

World War II
10 January 1942: Torpedo Squadron FOUR (VT-4) was established aboard  while the ship was in port at Grassy Bay, Bermuda.The squadron initially flew the TBD Devastator and was assigned to protect the sea lanes between Bermuda and Newfoundland from their homeport of Naval Air Station Quonset Point, Rhode Island.
August 1942, VT-4 transitioned from the TBD to the TBF Avenger.

8 August 1943: Ranger, with VT-4 aboard, met the convoy with the liner Queen Mary, which was bringing Winston Churchill to North America for the Quebec Conference.
August–November 1943: VT-4, while deployed aboard Ranger, operated as part of the British Home Fleet.
4 October 1943: The squadron participated in Operation Leader and struck at shipping targets around Kunna Head, Norway, while other elements of CVG-4 struck targets at Bodø, Norway. The squadron's TBF-1s, along with its escort of F4Fs, destroyed a German freighter and a small coaster and damaged a troop transport.
October 1943: VT-4, flying from Ranger, operated with the British Second Battle Squadron and patrolled the waters of the Norwegian Sea.
1 May 1944: CVG-4 reformed as a spare air group with a composition that was designed to include 36 fighter aircraft (F6F), 36 scout-bomber aircraft (SB2C) and 18 torpedo aircraft (TBF/TBM). This air group composition was organized to operate from the large deck carriers of the Essex class. Squadrons in CVG-4 included VT-4, VF-4 and VB-4. This change also brought an end to Air Group FOUR's operations aboard Ranger.

July 1944: VT-4 and CVG-4 transferred from Atlantic to Pacific Fleet.
15–21 July 1944: VT-4 aboard  en route to Pearl Harbor from San Diego.
21 September 1944: During a pre-dawn sortie involving simulated torpedo tactics, three of the squadron's aircraft collided with each other, resulting in the loss of nine personnel, including the squadron's commanding officer, Lieutenant Commander Homer H. Hutcheson.
The squadron participated in combat strikes at Ormoc Bay, Cavite and Clark Field.

December 1944: The squadron participated in combat operations in support of landings on Mindoro.
Operations in Vietnam were around Saigon and Camranh Bay. These operations were in support of the continued assault against the Japanese in the Philippines.
16 February 1945: The squadron conducted its first strikes against the home islands of Japan, hitting Mawatari airfield on Honshu. Other strikes against targets on Honshu were conducted on 17 and 25 February.
19–22 February 1945: CVG-4 provided support for the Battle of Iwo Jima.
1 March 1945: The airfield, facilities and shipping at Naha, Okinawa, were hit by squadron aircraft.
4 March 1945: VT-4 disembarked from Essex at Ulithi, completing the squadron's last combat cruise during World War II.
9–23 March 1945: CVG-4 aboard  for passage from Ulithi to Pearl Harbor. VT-4 eventually returned to the States in April 1945 for reforming following its combat cruise.

Postwar
15 February–15 April 1946: VT-4 along with other squadrons in CVG-4 participated in 's shakedown cruise in the Caribbean Sea following the ship's commissioning in December 1945.
November 1946: Some squadron aircraft were fitted with sonobuoy gear and personnel were trained in antisubmarine missions as well as their normal torpedo-attack requirements.
March 1949: the squadron moved to NAS Cecil Field, Florida and transitioned to the AD Skyraider.

1950s

22 May 1950: VA-15, along with the other squadrons in CVG-1, were designated as training squadrons and CVG-1 as a training air group. The squadron's primary mission was the training of fleet pilots in attack aircraft. VA-15's training syllabus emphasized glide bombing, dive-bombing, rocket firing, day-and-night tactics and carrier qualifications in the AD Skyraider.
19 September 1951: the CNO approved the squadron insignia, which was a modification of an earlier one depicting a lion riding a torpedo.  The lion was retained to represent the strong attack capabilities of the squadron and the torpedo was replaced by a missile.
13–23 September 1952: VA-15, while deployed aboard , participated in the first NATO naval operation, Operation Mainbrace, conducted in the North Atlantic.
February 1955: While deployed aboard , the squadron supported the evacuation of Chinese Nationalist civilians and military personnel from the Tachen Islands which were being bombarded by the People's Republic of China.
November–December 1956: As a result of the Suez Crisis, VA-15 deployed aboard  and operated in the vicinity of the Azores.
12 Sep 1958: VA-15 was assigned the additional mission of Aerial refuelling.

1960s

14–28 November 1960: VA-15, temporarily assigned to CVG-10, deployed aboard  to the Caribbean Sea to guard against possible infiltration into Guatemala and Nicaragua by insurgent organizations that were believed to have ties to Cuba.
March–April 1962: VA-15 deployed aboard  to the Caribbean and participated in the shakedown cruise of the world's first nuclear powered carrier.
August 1965: Although scheduled to transition to the A-6 Intruder, VA-15 began training under VA-44 for transition to the Douglas A-4 Skyhawk.
CVW-10 was an all-attack air wing composed of four attack squadrons, two squadrons flying A-4 Skyhawks and two squadrons with A-1 Skyraiders.
15 May 1966: The squadron flew its first combat mission since March 1945 when it was designated VT- 4 and a member of Carrier Air Group 4.
1967: VA-15 again returned to Southeast Asia on the USS Intrepid
1968-9: the squadron deployed to the Mediterranean on  after she was restored from the disastrous fire.

Home port assignments
The squadron was assigned to these home ports, effective on the dates shown:
 NAS Norfolk – Mar 1942
 NAS Quonset Point – Apr 1942
 NAAF Ayer (Fort Devens) – May 1944
 NAS Pearl Harbor – Jul 1944
 NAS Hilo – Aug 1944
 NAS Alameda – Apr 1945
 NAAS Watsonville – 21 May 1945
 NAS Quonset Point – 11 Jul 1945
 NAAF Groton – Aug 1945
 NAS Norfolk – Apr 1946
 NAS San Diego – 15 Jul 1946
 NAAS Cecil Field – 21 Mar 1949
 NAS Jacksonville – 09 Jan 1950
 NAAS Cecil Field – 29 Feb 1952
 NAS Jacksonville – Jul 1957
 NAS Oceana – Apr 1965
 NAS Cecil Field – Aug 1965

Aircraft assignment
The squadron was assigned the following aircraft in the months shown:
 Douglas TBD-1 Devastator – Jan 1942
 Grumman TBF-1 Avenger – Aug 1942
 Grumman TBF-1C/TBM-1C Avenger – Jan 1944
 Grumman TBM-3 Avenger – Jan 1945
 Grumman TBM-3E Avenger – May 1945
 Grumman TBM-3Q Avenger – 1946
 Douglas AD-4 Skyraider – 19 Aug 1949
 Douglas AD-4L Skyraider – 08 Mar 1951
 Douglas AD-6/AD-1H Skyraider – May 1954
 Douglas A-4B Skyhawk – Dec 1965
 Douglas A-4C Skyhawk – Dec 1966
 Douglas A-4E Skyhawk – Dec 1967

See also

 Attack aircraft
 History of the United States Navy
 List of inactive United States Navy aircraft squadrons

References

Attack squadrons of the United States Navy
Wikipedia articles incorporating text from the Dictionary of American Naval Aviation Squadrons